Gilbert Edward "Gil" Noble (February 22, 1932 – April 5, 2012) was an American television reporter and interviewer. He was the producer and host of New York City television station WABC-TV's weekly show Like It Is, originally co-hosted with Melba Tolliver. The program focused primarily on issues concerning African Americans and those within the African diaspora.

He was born in Harlem, New York, and raised by his parents who were Jamaican immigrants Gil and Iris Noble.  After graduating from the City College of New York he worked for Union Carbide.

Broadcast journalism career
In 1962 he got his professional break into broadcast media when he was hired as a part-time announcer at WLIB radio.  He began reading and reporting newscasts.  Noble joined WABC-TV in July 1967 as a reporter, after reporting on the 1967 Newark riots. Starting in January 1968 he became an anchor of its Saturday and Sunday night newscasts. He became host of Like It Is a few months prior to the rebranding of the station's newscasts as Eyewitness News in November  1968. In addition, he was an occasional interviewer on some of WABC's other public affairs shows, such as Eyewitness Exclusive. From 1986 on, Noble concentrated exclusively on Like It Is. Noble also created documentaries on such topics as W. E. B. Du Bois, Malcolm X, Fannie Lou Hamer, Ella Baker, Decade of Struggle, Martin Luther King Jr., Adam Clayton Powell, Jr., Jack Johnson, Charlie Parker and the documentary Essay on Drugs. In 1977, he wrote, directed and produced the first documentary on Paul Robeson, entitled The Tallest Tree in Our Forest.

In 1973, Noble reported (for local TV station WABC channel 7) on the first mobile cellular phone invented by Marty Cooper from the NY Hilton in New York. In 1981, he wrote an autobiography, Black is the Color of My TV Tube. He was a member of the board of directors of the Jazz Foundation of America, hosting the 2001, 2002, 2003, 2004 and 2007 "A Great Night in Harlem" Concert/Benefit for The Jazz Foundation to support The Musicians Emergency Fund. Noble won seven Emmy Awards and 650 community awards, and was granted five honorary doctorates.

Personal life 
Noble was born in Harlem to Jamaican immigrants Gilbert, the owner of an auto repair shop, and Iris Noble, a school teacher. During the Korean War, he was drafted into the United States Army.

In July 2011, Noble suffered a stroke. In late September, his family announced that he would not be returning to host Like It Is. The program ended its 43-year run the following month. His television station, WABC-TV, announced his death on April 5, 2012. He was 80 years old.

See also

List of WABC-TV personalities

References

Further reading

External links
Gil Noble at AEI Speakers
 Gil Noble at Visionary Project
EightCitiesMap.com: "It Really Does Take a Village! (Part 1): An Afternoon with Gil Noble"

American television journalists
Television anchors from New York City
New York (state) television reporters
People from Harlem
Anti-racism in the United States
African-American television personalities
Place of death missing
1932 births
2012 deaths
American people of Jamaican descent
American male journalists
20th-century African-American people
21st-century African-American people